Michael Jerome Cage Sr. (born January 28, 1962) is an American former professional basketball player and current broadcast analyst for the Oklahoma City Thunder.

Basketball career
A 6'9" power forward/center from San Diego State, he is the Aztecs' all-time rebounding leader and second leading scorer as of 2011. Cage was the 14th pick of the 1984 NBA draft.  He played 15 NBA seasons (1984–2000) with five teams: the Los Angeles Clippers, the Seattle SuperSonics, the Cleveland Cavaliers, the Philadelphia 76ers and the New Jersey Nets.

On January 19, 1987, Cage scored a career-high 29 points in a loss against the San Antonio Spurs.

During the 1987-88 season when, as a member of the Clippers, he led the league in rebounding with 13.0 per game. He was on a personal duel with Charles Oakley, who was playing with the Chicago Bulls at the time. Cage needed to register 28 rebounds in his final game to beat out Oakley for the rebounding title. He ended up grabbing 30. Just weeks later, during the 1988 NBA Draft, Cage was traded to the Seattle SuperSonics for a future first round pick and Gary Grant. During his first season in Seattle, Cage would make the postseason for the first time in his career. Several years later, during the 1993 NBA Playoffs, Cage and the SuperSonics would come within one game of reaching the NBA Finals, losing to the Charles Barkley-led Suns in seven games.

During his career, Cage earned the nicknames "John Shaft" and "Windexman" (as in "cleaning the glass") for his rebounding prowess and hard work on defense.

Cage held the record for most career 3-point attempts without a make (0–25) until Zaza Pachulia reached 0–26 for his career during the 2017–2018 season. Pachulia retired after the 2018 - 2019 season and he still holds the record at 0 - 31.

Cage's final game ever was on January 17, 2000, in a 96–101 loss to the Philadelphia 76ers where he recorded 3 rebounds and 1 assist, but no points.

Personal life
Cage and his wife Jodi have three children: Alexis, Michael, Jr. and Sydney.

On September 17, 2014, the Oklahoma City Thunder announced Cage would be joining their broadcast team, replacing analyst Grant Long.

See also
 List of National Basketball Association season rebounding leaders

References

External links

 Official Website
 NBA biography of Cage (archived from 2000)

1962 births
Living people
20th-century African-American sportspeople
21st-century African-American people
African-American basketball players
All-American college men's basketball players
American men's basketball players
American sports announcers
Basketball players at the 1983 Pan American Games
Basketball players from Arkansas
Centers (basketball)
Cleveland Cavaliers players
College basketball announcers in the United States
Los Angeles Clippers announcers
Los Angeles Clippers players
Los Angeles Lakers announcers
Medalists at the 1983 Pan American Games
Memphis Grizzlies announcers
New Jersey Nets players
Oklahoma City Thunder announcers
Pan American Games gold medalists for the United States
Pan American Games medalists in basketball
People from West Memphis, Arkansas
Philadelphia 76ers players
Phoenix Suns announcers
Power forwards (basketball)
San Diego Clippers draft picks
San Diego State Aztecs men's basketball players
Seattle SuperSonics players